George Baker (31 May 1838 – 2 June 1870) was an English cricketer active between 1859 and 1863. Baker was born in Cobham, Kent and played 27 first-class cricket matches in his career, including 22 for Kent County Cricket Club and three for MCC. His brother William played one first-class match for Kent in 1858. He died in Lydd in 1870 aged 32.

References

External links

1838 births
1870 deaths
English cricketers
Kent cricketers
Marylebone Cricket Club cricketers
North v South cricketers
New All England Eleven cricketers
People from Cobham, Kent